Parduczia is a genus of karyorelict ciliates in the family Geleiidae.

Parduczia species are filiform to serpentiform ciliates characterized by their giant size (1.2 to 2.5 mm on average) and their very long buccal split.

The genus name is a taxonomic patronym honoring the protistologist Béla Párducz (1911–1964).

Systematics 
Five species are currently described in the genus Parduczia.
 Parduczia arcachonense (Nouzarède, 1965) Dragesco, 1999
 Parduczia filiformis (Nouzarède, 1977) Dragesco, 1999
 Parduczia martinicense (Nouzarède, 1977) Dragesco, 1999
 Parduczia murmanica (Raikov, 1962) Dragesco, 1999
 Parduczia orbis (Fauré-Fremiet, 1950) Dragesco, 1999 is the type species of the genus.

Phylogeny 
Comparison and phylogenetic analysis of 18S rRNA sequences showed that Parduczia orbis is the sister group to Corlissina maricaensis. In turn, these two genera form a clade with Geleia.

Alternative genetic code 
An alternative genetic code is used by the nuclear genome of Parduczia sp. This code corresponds to the translation table 27 and involves the unusual reassignment of the three standard termination codons to sense codons:

Notes

References 

Ciliate genera
Karyorelictea
Taxa described in 1999